The 1935 International Lawn Tennis Challenge was the 30th edition of what is now known as the Davis Cup. Due to increased political tensions in Europe, entries for the Europe Zone declined sharply, causing the Qualifying Round system to be scrapped. Only 11 teams would enter the Europe Zone, with 17 teams entering the qualifying rounds; while six would enter the Americas Zone, 4 in North America and 2 in South America. Estonia entered the tournament for the first time.

In the America Inter-Zonal Final the United States received a walkover due to Brazil's absence, while in the Europe Zone final Germany defeated Czechoslovakia. The United States defeated Germany in the Inter-Zonal play-off, but would fall to Great Britain in the Challenge Round. The final was played at the All England Club Centre Court in Wimbledon, London, England on 27–30 July.

America Zone

North & Central America Zone

South America Zone

Americas Inter-Zonal Final
United States vs. Brazil

United States defeated Brazil by walkover.

Europe Zone

Qualifying round

Main Draw

Final
Czechoslovakia vs. Germany

Inter-Zonal Zone
United States vs. Germany

Challenge Round
Great Britain vs. United States

See also
 1935 Wightman Cup

Notes

References

External links
Davis Cup official website

Davis Cups by year
 
International Lawn Tennis Challenge
International Lawn Tennis Challenge
International Lawn Tennis Challenge
International Lawn Tennis Challenge
International Lawn Tennis Challenge